Nucleolar protein 9 is a protein that in humans is encoded by the NOL9 gene.

References

Further reading